A statue of King Kong by Nicholas Monro was commissioned in 1972 for display in Manzoni Gardens in The Bull Ring, in the centre of Birmingham, England. It was later displayed elsewhere in Birmingham, then at markets in Edinburgh, Penrith (where it was subsequently stored), at the Henry Moore Institute in Leeds, and now in the owner's garden in Cumbria.

The Arnolfini Gallery in Bristol owned a maquette of the statue which is now in the collection of Wolverhampton Art Gallery.

History

Birmingham 

Modelled on the fictional giant gorilla King Kong, the -tall,  fibreglass statue was commissioned for display in Birmingham from March to November 1972, by the Peter Stuyvesant Foundation for the Sculpture for Public Places Scheme "City Sculpture", in partnership with the Arts Council of Great Britain.

It was constructed at the artist's studio at Hungerford. Monro's brief was to make something "city orientated" and he chose King Kong because of his association with New York City and "for my own petty reasons".

The statue was displayed in Manzoni Gardens (previously the site of Birmingham Market Hall; now subsumed beneath the Bullring shopping mall). On 14 July 1972 it was "occupied" by two flying pickets, who were protesting about low wages in the building industry as part of the national builders' strike. They sat on its shoulders and hung from its neck a banner reading "King Kong says nothing less than £30 for 35 hours and up your T.P.I."

After the statue had been on display for four months, Birmingham City Council was offered the opportunity to purchase the work at a reduced rate of £2,000, but decided not to retain it, and so in September 1972, it was sold for £3,000 to a local used-car dealer, Mike Shanley, who changed the name of his dealership to King Kong Car Co. and displayed the statue at his sales lot on the A34 Stratford Road, next to the former Holy Trinity church in the Camp Hill area of the city. While there, it was dressed up as Father Christmas in season, and it also survived a fire in June 1974.

During 1975 it was loaned to Birmingham School of Architecture, between 30 June and 3 July, as a symbol for the 'City of the Future' symposium which took part at the Gosta Green campus.

By 1976, the statue had moved to a new location on Ladypool Road, Sparkbrook, close to the Clifton Road junction. It stood at the rear face of the Clifton public house. It was still being used to advertise a King Kong cars dealership at this location and Mike Shanley was still the owner of this business.

Edinburgh 

In 1976, it was sold for £12,700 to Nigel Maby's Scottish company Spook Erection Ltd and displayed  at Ingliston Market in Edinburgh. During that period, it was falsely reported destroyed, and repainted several times, including once in tartan, and, in 2001, in shocking pink. Before removal from Edinburgh on the closure of that market in 2005, the statue suffered  damage by vandals to its back, and a broken arm, requiring repair.

Penrith 

It was subsequently displayed at Skirsgill Auction Mart, a market site in Penrith, and was still there in January 2011 albeit lying down, in a car park near its former position. There were calls for it to be returned to Birmingham, but the owner, Lesley Maby (wife of the late Nigel), refused to sell it.

Leeds 

In November 2016 the statue, which had been repainted in its original colours, was moved to the Henry Moore Institute in Leeds, to be exhibited at the City Sculpture Projects 1972 exhibition, commemorating the original "City Sculpture" programme, to be held 24 November 2016 – 19 February 2017, and where Monro spoke on 23 November. The statue's maquette, on loan from Wolverhampton Art Gallery, was also part of the exhibition.

Cumbria 

The statue left Leeds on 28 February 2017 and was returned to owner Lesley Maby's garden in Cumbria where it has remained ever since.

2022 recreation 

It was unveiled in a pop-up park on Great Hampton Row in Birmingham's Jewellery Quarter in July 2022, to coincide with the Commonwealth Games held in the city. Plans have been submitted for it to be relocated to the Chung Ying Plaza development on Thorp Street in Birmingham's Southside quarter, at a later date.

In media 

The comedian and entertainer Victoria Wood wrote a song about the statue, in 1973, as part of her studies at the University of Birmingham. Part of it was broadcast in a 2020 BBC programme about her career.

The music journalist Peter Paphides wrote in his 2020 autobiographical work Broken Greek that his childhood phobias included:

Images of the statue feature extensively in the 2020 documentary film King Rocker.

Locations

References

External links 

 Film interview with Monro filmed by ATV in Manzoni Gardens, Birmingham, in 1972
 Birmingham mail article with photos
 Flickr group for pictures of the statue

Outdoor sculptures in England
History of Birmingham, West Midlands
1972 sculptures
Fiberglass sculptures
Culture in Birmingham, West Midlands
History of Edinburgh
Culture in Edinburgh
King Kong (franchise)
Penrith, Cumbria
Pop art
Gorillas in art
Statues of fictional characters